Waibel is a German surname. Notable people with the surname include:

Alex Waibel, German computer scientist
Bruce Waibel (1958–2003), American musician
Craig Waibel (born 1975), American soccer player
Eva Maria Waibel (born 1953), Austrian politician (ÖVP)
Gerhard Waibel (engineer) (born 1938), German aerospace engineer
Gerhard Waibel (motorcyclist) (born 1958), German motorcycle racer
Wolfram Waibel Jr. (born 1970), Austrian sport shooter

German-language surnames